Doina is a commune in Cahul District, Moldova. It is composed of three villages: Doina, Iasnaia Poleana and Rumeanțev.

References

Communes of Cahul District